is a Japanese politician of the Liberal Democratic Party, a member of the House of Representatives in the Diet (national legislature). A native of Nago, Okinawa and graduate of Waseda University, he had served in the assembly of Okinawa Prefecture for five terms since 1980. He was elected to the House of Representatives for the first time in 1996. He lost his seat to Denny Tamaki in the 2009 general election.

References 
 

Members of the House of Representatives (Japan)
Waseda University alumni
People from Okinawa Prefecture
Living people
1941 births
21st-century Japanese politicians